Brachyscome aculeata, commonly known as hill daisy is a tufted perennial herb in the family Asteraceae and is endemic to Australia. It has mostly white daisy-like flowers, a yellow centre, variable shaped leaves and flowers in spring to autumn.

Description
The uppermost leaves are smooth edged, narrow to lance shaped. Flowering occurs from October to April.

Taxonomy and naming
The species was originally named Bellis aculeata in 1806 by Jacques Labillardière and the description published in Novae Hollandiae Plantarum Specimen. In 1832  Christian Friedrich Lessing changed the name to Brachyscome aculeata and the description was published in Synopsis Generum Compositarum. The specific epithet (aculeata) is derived from the Latin word aculeatus meaning "prickly" or "sharp-pointed".

Distribution and habitat
In New South Wales hill daisy is found growing in dry locations in the southern tablelands from Wingello to Kosciuszko National Park. In Victoria mainly found in the east of the state growing in wet locations, in the Grampians region, also at higher altitudes but rarely into open herb fields.

References

aculeata
Flora of New South Wales
Flora of Victoria (Australia)
Plants described in 1832